Deborah Jeanne Rowe (born December 6, 1958) is an American dermatology assistant who was married to pop musician Michael Jackson, with whom she had two children. She lives in Palmdale, California.

Early life

Debbie Rowe was born on December 6th, 1958 in Spokane, Washington, the daughter of Barbara Chilcutt and Gordon Rowe. Her father divorced her mother a few weeks before her second birthday. She was raised by her mother, a few aunts, and her maternal grandmother.

Rowe married Richard Edelman in 1982 and converted to Judaism. The couple divorced six years later in 1988.

Relationship with Michael Jackson

Rowe met Michael Jackson while working as an assistant in Arnold Klein's dermatology office, where Jackson was being treated for vitiligo. She recalled that after Jackson's divorce from Lisa Marie Presley in 1996, he was upset that he might not become a father. Rowe, a longtime Jackson fan, proposed to bear his children. In an interview with Playboy, Lisa Marie stated that she knew at the time that she and Jackson were married that Rowe wanted to have his children and that Rowe had "a crush on him".

Children and marriage

Rowe had suffered a miscarriage in 1996 which devastated her. Jackson consoled her the whole way through and it was announced Rowe was pregnant again in 1996; the two were married on November 14, 1996, in Sydney, Australia.

Rowe had a son, Michael Joseph Jackson Jr. (born February 13, 1997, at Cedars-Sinai Medical Center in Los Angeles), who was subsequently nicknamed Prince. The next year she gave birth to a daughter, Paris Jackson (born April 3, 1998, at Spaulding Pain Medical Clinic in Beverly Hills in Los Angeles). Jackson took full responsibility for raising the children.

Divorce
Rowe, who described herself as a private person and almost never gave interviews, was overwhelmed by the publicity that came with being married to Jackson. The couple divorced in April 2000, and Rowe gave full custody rights of the children to Jackson. Rowe received a US$8 million settlement and a house in Beverly Hills, California. Court documents indicated she had signed a prenuptial agreement and therefore could not obtain an equal division of community property under California law.

In 2001, Rowe went to a private judge to have her parental rights for the two children terminated. In 2004, after Jackson was charged with 10 counts of child abuse, she went to court to have the decision reversed. According to the Jewish Telegraphic Agency, Rowe, who is Jewish, sought the reversal in part because she feared the nanny and some of Jackson's siblings were exposing the children to teachings of the Nation of Islam. Court documents from 2005 noted that "[b]ecause she is Jewish, Deborah feared the children might be mistreated if Michael continued the association." On the stand, in the 2005 People v. Jackson case, she explained that she had been granted limited visits to her children, for eight hours every 45 days.

In 2005, Rowe sold her Beverly Hills house for $1.3 million and bought a ranch in Palmdale. In 2006, she sued Jackson for one immediate payment of $195,000 and one payment of $50,000 to pursue a child custody case.  Jackson was ordered to pay her $60,000 in legal fees.

After Jackson's death
Following Jackson's death on June 25, 2009, Rowe made statements through her attorney to deny a series of gossip reports, including reports that she was not the children's biological mother and that she was attempting to bargain her parental rights for money.

In July 2009, she filed a lawsuit for defamation and invasion of privacy against a source who handed over alleged private e-mails to the television entertainment news program Extra, and on March 3, 2010, she was successful in the defamation lawsuit. She was awarded $27,000 in damages, although she had originally sought $500,000.

In August 2009, Rowe reached a settlement with Katherine Jackson, the children's guardian, under which Rowe has rights to supervised visitations.

In April 2014, Rowe announced on Entertainment Tonight that she was engaged to music producer and former Neverland Ranch videographer Marc Schaffel, who worked with Jackson on his 9/11 charity single "What More Can I Give". Schaffel was the sole Jackson employee who was permitted access to visit Rowe following their divorce in 1999 and he assisted Rowe with her health problems.

Health
In 2016, Rowe was diagnosed with breast cancer.

In popular culture
Rowe was portrayed by April Telek in the 2004 film Man in the Mirror: The Michael Jackson Story.

References

External links
 

1950s births
Living people
20th-century American Jews
Converts to Judaism
People from Spokane, Washington
People from Palmdale, California
Michael Jackson
21st-century American Jews